Khalil Zaouia is a Tunisian politician. He serves as the Minister of Social Affairs under Prime Minister Hamadi Jebali.

Biography

Early life and career
Khalil Zaouia was born on July 20, 1961, in Tunis. He has been a professor and orthopedic surgeon at the Charles-Nicolle Hospital of Tunis since July 2011 in Tunis.

Politics
He has served on the board of trustees of the Ligue Tunisienne des Droits de l'Homme since 1988. He is a founding member of the Ettakatol political party, and a member of the Tunisian General Labour Union. He is a former advisor of Mustapha Ben Jafar.

On 20 December 2011, he joined the Jebali Cabinet as Minister of Social Affairs.

Private life
He is married, and has two children.

References

Living people
1961 births
People from Tunis
Tunisian orthopedic surgeons
Government ministers of Tunisia
Members of the Constituent Assembly of Tunisia